Fluted Peak may refer to:

 Singu Chuli, a 6,501 metre trekking peak in central Nepal
 Fluted Peak (Colorado), a high mountain summit in Colorado, U.S.
 Fluted Peak (Antarctica), GNIS feature id 5068